Bevil Arthur Glover (25 March 1926 – 2000) was an English footballer who played as a central defender for Stockport County and Rochdale.

References

Stockport County F.C. players
Rochdale A.F.C. players
1926 births
2000 deaths
Footballers from Salford
English footballers
Association football defenders